The 2008 English cricket season was the 109th in which the County Championship had been an official competition. Four regular tournaments were played: The LV County Championship (first-class), Friends Provident Trophy (50 Over), NatWest Pro40 League (40 Over) and the Twenty20 Cup (T20). All four tournaments featured the eighteen classic county cricket teams, although the Friends Provident Trophy also featured sides from Ireland and Scotland.

In the county championship, Durham won their first championship title by 8 points from Nottinghamshire. Kent and Surrey were the two sides to be relegated to Division Two, with Surrey failing to register a win for the first time since 1871. It completed a miserable season for Surrey, who also finished bottom of their Twenty20 Cup division and failed to progress from the group stage of the Friends Provident Trophy. Warwickshire and Worcestershire were the two sides promoted from Division Two.

In the other competitions, Essex won the Friend's Provident Trophy with a 5 wicket victory over Kent; Sussex claimed the Pro40 Division 1 title with a last ball six, leaving Hampshire runners up. Last year's champions Worcestershire had to beat Glamorgan in the play-off to retain their Division 1 status for next year, while Middlesex and Lancashire were relegated. Essex bounced back from relegation last season to win the Division 2 title and, with it, a place in the top division alongside runners-up Yorkshire. Middlesex won their first domestic title in 15 years in the Twenty20 Cup with a 3 run win over reigning champions Kent.

New Zealand toured England to compete in a test series which England won 2-0 and South Africa toured England to compete in a test series which South Africa won 2-1.

Roll of honour
Test series
England v New Zealand: 3 Tests - England won 2–0.
England v South Africa: 4 Tests - South Africa won 2–1.
ODI series
England v New Zealand: 5 ODI's - New Zealand won 3–1.
England v South Africa: 5 ODI's - England won 4–0. (One match abandoned due to rain)
England v Scotland: 1 ODI - Match abandoned because of rain.
Twenty20 Internationals
England v New Zealand: 1 Twenty20 International - England won.
England v South Africa: 1 Twenty20 International - Match abandoned because of rain.
County Championship
Champions: Durham
Division Two winners: Warwickshire
Friends Provident Trophy
Winners: Essex - Runners-up: Kent
Pro40 (National League)
Division One winners: Sussex
Division Two winners: Essex
Twenty20 Cup
Winners: Middlesex - Runners-up: Kent
Minor Counties Championship
Winners: Berkshire - Runners-up: Lincolnshire
MCCA Knockout Trophy
Winners: Devon - Runners-up: Berkshire
Second XI Championship
Winners: Durham 2nd XI
Second XI Trophy
Winners: Hampshire 2nd XI - Runners-up: Essex 2nd XI

Test Series

South African tour

New Zealand tour

LV County Championship

Divisions

Division One Standings

Division Two Standings

Friends Provident Trophy

Source: BBC Sport

Natwest Pro40

Source: BBC Sport

Worcestershire beat Glamorgan in the playoff match to retain their Division 1 status for the 2009 season.

Twenty20 Cup

Knockout stage

References

External links
 2008 English cricket season from Cricinfo

 
2008 in cricket
Cricket season
 2008